Rodrigue Ele (born 2 March 1998) is a Cameroonian footballer who played for Seattle Sounders FC 2 in the United Soccer League.

Career

Youth 
Ele played for the youth and development academy of Rainbow Bamenda of the Cameroonian Elite One.

Professional 
On 22 March 2017, Ele signed with the Seattle Sounders FC 2 of the United Soccer League. Ele made his S2 debut on 15 April 2017 in a 2–1 victory over LA Galaxy II.

References

External links 
S2 Profile

1998 births
Living people
Cameroonian footballers
Cameroonian expatriate footballers
Rainbow FC (Cameroon) players
Tacoma Defiance players
Association football forwards
Expatriate soccer players in the United States
USL Championship players